Beezen is a Plateau language of Cameroon.  The Baazem variety is divergent.

References

Yukubenic languages
Languages of Cameroon